Asemostera is a genus of dwarf spiders that was first described by Eugène Louis Simon in 1898. Originally placed with the family Agelenidae, it was moved to the family Linyphiidae in 1965.

Species
 it contains nine species:
Asemostera arcana (Millidge, 1991) – Costa Rica to Venezuela
Asemostera daedalus Miller, 2007 – Costa Rica, Panama, Colombia
Asemostera dianae Rodrigues & Brescovit, 2012 – Peru
Asemostera enkidu Miller, 2007 – Colombia, Venezuela
Asemostera involuta (Millidge, 1991) – Ecuador
Asemostera janetae Miller, 2007 – Peru, Bolivia, Argentina
Asemostera latithorax (Keyserling, 1886) (type) – Brazil
Asemostera pallida (Millidge, 1991) – Peru
Asemostera tacuapi Rodrigues, 2007 – Brazil

See also
 List of Linyphiidae species

References

Araneomorphae genera
Linyphiidae
Spiders of Central America
Spiders of South America